The 1987 Soviet Cup Final was a football match that took place at the Lenin's Central Stadium, Moscow on June 14, 1987. The match was the 46th Soviet Cup Final and it was contested by FC Dynamo Kyiv and FC Dinamo Minsk. The Soviet Cup winner Dynamo won the cup for the eighth time. The last year defending holders Torpedo Moscow were eliminated in the quarterfinals of the competition by FC Dinamo Minsk 3:2.

Road to Moscow 

All sixteen Soviet Top League clubs did not have to go through qualification to get into the competition, so Dynamo Kyiv and Dinamo Minsk both qualified for the competition automatically.

Previous Encounters

Match details

MATCH OFFICIALS 
Assistant referees:
 A.Kirillov (Moscow)
 S.Khusainov (Moscow)
Fourth official: 

MATCH RULES
90 minutes.
30 minutes of extra-time if necessary.
Penalty shoot-out if scores still level.
Seven named substitutes
Maximum of 3 substitutions.

See also
 Soviet Top League 1987
 Soviet First League 1987
 Soviet Second League 1987

References

External links 
The competition calendar

1987
Cup
Soviet Cup Final 1987
Soviet Cup Final 1987
Soviet Cup Final 1987
Soviet Cup Final
Soviet Cup Final